George Ducas is the self-titled debut studio album by American country music singer George Ducas. It was released in September 1994 on Liberty Records, and peaked at number 57.  It featured four singles: "Teardrops" (number 38), "Hello Cruel World" (number 52), "Kisses Don't Lie" (number 72), and his biggest hit, "Lipstick Promises",  which reached number 9.

Critical reception
Rating it 3 out of 5 stars, Bill Hobbs of the Tampa Bay Times called the album's sound "so classic and yet so contemporary". He also considered the single "Lipstick Promises" to be the strongest track, comparing it favorably to Roy Orbison.

Track listing

Personnel
Musicians
 Richard Bennett - acoustic guitar, electric guitar
 Billy Bremner - electric guitar
 Mike Brignardello - bass guitar
 Terry Crisp - pedal steel guitar
 Chad Cromwell - drums
 George Ducas - acoustic guitar
 Dan Dugmore - pedal steel guitar, acoustic guitar
 Glen Duncan - fiddle
 Dave Hoffner - piano, Hammond B-3 organ
 Larry Marrs - bass guitar
 Angelo Petraglia - acoustic guitar, electric guitar
 Hank Singer - fiddle
 Billy Thomas - drums

Background vocals
 Deryl Dodd
 George Ducas
 Jim Lauderdale
 Kim Richey
 Harry Stinson

Nashville Mandolin Ensemble
 Butch Baldassari - leader, first mandolin
 John Mock - arrangement, first mandolin
 Rob Haines - first mandolin
 Bob Alenko - second mandolin
 Fred Carpenter - second mandolin
 Charlie Derrington - mandola
 John Hedgecloth - mandocello

Strings
 John Catchings - leader, cello
 Richard Grosjean - viola
 Mary Van Osdale - violin
 David Davidson - violin
 Pamela Sixfin - violin
 Christian Teal - violin

Technical
 Richard Bennett - producer
 John Hampton - recording ("Teardrops" and "Kisses Don't Lie")
 Dave Hoffner - string arrangement
 Denny Purcell - mastering
 Rocky Schnarrs - recording (except "Teardrops" and "Kisses Don't Lie")

Chart performance

References

"George Ducas" CD Liner Notes.  1995, Liberty Records

1995 debut albums
George Ducas (singer) albums
Liberty Records albums
Albums produced by Richard Bennett (guitarist)